Rotowaro was once a small coal mining township approximately 10 km west of Huntly in the Waikato region of New Zealand. The town was built especially for miners houses, but was entirely removed in the 1980s to make way for a large opencast mine.

History 
Mining by Taupiri Coal Co began in Rotowaro around 1915 after a railway to the area and a bridge over the Waikato River were completed. In 1928 it was producing 11,000 tons of coal a month.

The current open cast working and the much smaller O'Reilly's, Puke Coal and Maramarua are the only remaining mines in the Waikato coalfield. It opened in 1958 and produces about 700,000 tonnes a year to make steel at Glenbrook and for limeworks, meat works, timber processing, light industry and horticulture. It was sold by Solid Energy to Bathurst Resources and Talleys in 2016.

The Rotowaro Class A train station was opened on the Huntly-Awaroa railway on 11 February 1918 (or 7 January) and closed to passengers on 26 June 1972 and to goods on 12 August 1997.

A hall was built in Rotowaro during the 1920s and opened by Rev H G Gilbert on 28 April 1929. The Royal Antediluvian Order of Buffaloes NZ Constitution of the Grand Lodge of England once had a lodge in Rotowaro, the aptly named Rotowaro Lodge No. 106 which at one point owned its own Lodge Hall in Rotowaro. The Lodge relocated to Ngāruawāhia in the 1980s but has long since ceased to operate. The formation of the Buffaloes lodge in Rotowaro was preceded by the establishment of other Fraternal Orders in Rotowaro such as the Oddfellows.

In the late 1960s local legend Floyd Cox set up a pioneer Private Radio Station in Rotowaro, broadcasting out to surrounding areas.

Rotowaro's association football team was one of the strongest clubs in the Waikato Region in the 1920s and 1930s, reaching later rounds of the Chatham Cup on several occasions.

See also 
 Rotowaro Carbonisation Plant

References

External links 
 Renown Mine about 1910
 One inch map 1944
 The Bush Tramway Club
 http://www.archives.presbyterian.org.nz/photodatabases/1929parishimages.htm

Geography of Waikato
Ghost towns in New Zealand
Waikato District
Mining communities in New Zealand